Circus was the codename given to operations by the Royal Air Force (RAF) during the Second World War where bombers, with a mass escort of fighters, were sent over continental Europe to bring  fighters into combat. These were usually formations of 20 to 30 bombers escorted by up to 16 squadrons of escort fighters.

The Hampdens were replaced with Bristol Blenheim light bombers but those fared no better. Heavy bombers such as the Short Stirling were easier to escort but after several missions Bomber Command needed them back.

The "Hurribomber", a fighter-bomber development of the Hawker Hurricane, was used with better results, although the small bomb load carried by this aircraft caused little damage.

There were other codenames for similar missions.
 Ramrod: similar to Circus but with destroying a target being the principal aim. An example would be Operation Ramrod 16.
 Ranger: large fighter formation intrusion over occupied territory with aim of wearing down German fighter force.
 Roadstead: low-level attack on coastal shipping.
 Rhubarb: small-scale freelance fighter sorties against ground targets of opportunity.

History
Following the end of the Battle of Britain RAF Fighter Command moved from defensive to offensive operations where they would engage German fighters on the other side of the Channel; the operational instructions were ready by December 1940.

There would be two types of offensive operation: "Rhubarb" (initially called Mosquito), in which small patrols would cross under cover of cloudy conditions and engage any aircraft they found; and on clear weather days "Circus", in which several squadrons - possibly with a few bombers - would conduct sweeps of northern France. Circus came to mean an operation with bombers.

Rhubarb patrols began in December 1940; while the pilots were allowed to attack ground targets if any presented itself, their primary objective was to bring down German aircraft. By mid-June 1941, Fighter Command had flown 149 Rhubarb patrols (336 sorties) claiming seven enemy aircraft brought down for loss of eight pilots on the British side. Circus operations with bombers began in January and eleven had been carried out by June, the targets including docks on the French coast and airfields. More than forty sweeps without bombers had been made in the same period. While Fighter Command's priority was the German fighters, Bomber Command concentrated on destroying the ground targets. At higher levels in the RAF it was felt that the effects on the war by damage that could be inflicted by the bombers would be minimal; the commanders of Bomber and Fighter Commands held a conference in which it was agreed that the purpose of a Circus was to force German fighters into combat in circumstances that favoured the British and to that end the bombers had to do enough damage that the  could not ignore the attacks.

The resulting policy was to conduct Circus operations against industrial targets in the region of Bethune, Lille in north-east France; this might draw German fighter defences towards the area leaving the defences on the flanks weaker for unescorted bombers to make daylight attacks on Germany. At the same time night bombing operations would be made against the Ruhr industrial region. The Air Ministry directed the RAF that the purpose of Circuses would be destruction of the ground targets with German fighters as secondary priority. It soon became clear that unescorted daylight bombing was too risky and heavy bombers should be used on night operations only. Over six weeks RAF Fighter Command flew 8,000 sorties in support of 376 bomber sorties and a further 800 sorties on sweeps. Fighter Command was losing pilots and aircraft on operations over Europe but losses were lighter than during the Battle of Britain and aircraft losses were replaceable. In August, Circuses were flown with 2 Group and 5 Groups, Bomber Command.

See also
 Royal Air Force daylight raids, 1940–1944

Notes

Footnotes

References
 Caygill, Peter. The Biggin Hill Wing – 1941: From Defence to Attack. Pen & Sword Aviation, 2008.

Further reading
 
 
 
 
 
 
 

Aerial operations and battles of World War II involving the United Kingdom
History of the Royal Air Force during World War II
World War II aerial operations and battles of the Western European Theatre